"Fly Away" is a song by Australian singer Tones and I. It was released on 13 November 2020, through Bad Batch Records and Elektra Records, as the lead single from her debut studio album Welcome to the Madhouse (2021).

At the 2021 ARIA Music Awards, the song was nominated for Song of the Year and Best Pop Release.

At the APRA Music Awards of 2022, the song won Most Performed Pop Work and was nominated for Most Performed Australian Work.

Background
About the song, Tones said: "'Fly Away' is about chasing your dreams, reaching your goals, and the realities that come with it". The song was announced on social media on 9 November 2020, with a snippet of the song.

Music video
The music video for "Fly Away" was directed by Nick Kozakis and Liam Kelly and premiered on 13 November 2020.

Credits and personnel
Credits adapted from Tidal.
 Toni Watson – songwriting, production
 Dann Hume – production, mixing
 Andrei Eremin – mastering

Charts

Weekly charts

Year-end charts

Certifications

Release history

References

2020 singles
2020 songs
APRA Award winners
Tones and I songs
Song recordings produced by Dann Hume
Song recordings produced by Tones and I
Songs written by Tones and I